Huda El-Sarari or Hoda El-Sarari; Hoda Al Sarari (born c. 1978) is a human rights lawyer from Yemen who was awarded the Martin Ennals Award. She exposed that foreign governments were operating prisons in Yemen. 260 people were released from unlawful imprisonment.

Life 
She graduated law and then took a masters in Women's Studies at Aden University completing in 2011.

She went to work challenging human rights abuses. She worked with the Yemeni Women’s Union, the Adala Foundation for Rights and Freedoms and the National Committee to Investigate Allegations of Human Rights Violations.

In 2015 she contacted Amnesty International and Human Rights Watch after she found that people were being detained and mistreated in jails organised by foreigners in Yemen. She was in time able to supply them with details of 250 men and boys who were imprisoned.

She was contacted by mothers in 2016 who wanted to know where their sons were as they had just gone missing. She used the Yemeni courts but no information could be produced. Using social media she managed to unearth the truth that there were prisons in Yemen that the judicial system was unaware of. In 2017 the story was revealed by the Associated Press using much of her research to substantiate the story.

Over 2,000 people are still missing, but she managed to form the "Union of Mothers of Abductees" and 260 prisoners were released.

In 2019 her son, Mohsen, was wounded and died in hospital and after this she left her country. She believes that many Europeans and Americans do not realise that their governments are backing the UAE which funds human rights abuses.

She was nominated for the Martin Ennals Award for Human Rights Defenders together with Sizani Ngubane, of South Africa, and Norma Librada Ledezma. She became the 2020 laureate in Geneva in February 2020.

Awards 
 Aurora Prize in 2019
 Martin Ennals Award in 2020

References 

Women lawyers
1970s births
Living people
Yemeni Muslims
Yemeni human rights activists
Yemeni lawyers